The Popular Social Party (Greek: Λαϊκό Κοινωνικό Κόμμα) was a Greek political party that formed after a split from the People's Party. It was founded in January 1956 by Stefanos Stefanopoulos.

The Popular Social Party participated in the elections of 1956 but failed to enter the parliament. In the elections of 1958 it participated with other right-wing parties in the Union of Populars and elected two MPs.

Political program
Its main political program, as it was claimed, was social and economic justice. The party suggested social reforms and a new organization of the Greek economy.

See also
List of political parties in Greece

Conservative parties in Greece
Eastern Orthodox political parties
Defunct political parties in Greece
1950s in Greek politics
1960s in Greek politics
Political parties established in 1956
1956 establishments in Greece
Political parties disestablished in 1961
1961 disestablishments in Greece